Washington Latin Public Charter is a school in Northwest, Washington, D.C., United States. It features a middle and upper school, serving grades 5–12.

Washington Latin was modeled after Boston Latin School, which was the first public school in the United States that taught children under the age of 25. The motto of the school is discite servaturi, meaning "Learn, those who are about to serve".

History
WLPCS opened in 2006 with 179 students in grades five through seven. They have added a grade each year and graduated their first class of high school seniors on 8 June, 2012.

Their first location was in Christ Church of Washington (now Embassy Church) at 3855 Massachusetts Avenue (two blocks west of Washington National Cathedral).

In 2008, they added a second campus for the eighth and ninth graders at 4715 16th Street on the corner of Decatur Street NW, which is now the location of the Jewish Primary Day School of the Nation's Capital.

In 2009 they moved the entire middle school (grades 5–8) to the Saints Constantine and Helen Greek Orthodox Church (now Iglesia Ni Cristo - Church of Christ) property at 4115 16th Street NW on the corner of Upshur Street NW, just a half-mile from the Upper School.

In 2010, they added an additional campus for their Upper School at 4501 16th Street NW, on the corner of Allison Street NW in an annex of the Simpson-Hamline United Methodist Church.

On July 16, 2012, Washington Latin was awarded the former building of the Rudolph Elementary School at 5200 2nd Street, NW.  They modernized and renovated the building and constructed a library. A gymnasium addition was completed on June 9th, 2016. The gymnasium is the first cross laminated timber (CLT) structure in the District of Columbia. The design of the modernization and addition projects was done by Perkins Eastman Architects and Demian Wilbur Architects, and constructed by MCN Build.

All 600 students of the Upper School and Middle School moved into the same building at the start of the 2013–14 school year.

The campus is approximately 69,000 square feet on 4.20 acres and includes two large playing fields.

Academics
Washington Latin offers a classical education. That model emphasizes the Socratic method, recitation of information for memorization, and public speaking. 

In addition to Latin, the school offers French, Mandarin Chinese, and Arabic. Students are required to take Latin through level three and another modern language through level two in order to graduate. 

48% of Washington Latin's Upper School teachers have a graduate degree.

Results
As of 2017, Washington Latin's Middle School and Upper School are both rated Tier 1 by the District of Columbia Public Charter School Board.

Washington Latin's 4-year high school graduation rate is 90.3%.

The school states that more than 75% of their students' AP exam results are passing scores.

In 2017, 66% of Washington Latin students achieved proficiency in the English Language Arts/Literacy section of their PARCC exams and 52% achieved proficiency in the Math section. The same year, all public and public charter school students in the District of Columbia averaged 31% proficient in English Language Arts/Literacy and 27% proficient in Math.

Athletics

High School Sports
 Boys' and girls' cross-country
 Boys' and girls' soccer
 Girls' volleyball
 Boys' and girls' basketball
 Co-ed cheerleading
 Co-ed indoor track
 Co-ed wrestling
 Girls' lacrosse
 Girls' softball
 Co-ed track
 Co-ed ultimate frisbee

Middle School Sports
 Boys' cross-country
 Girls' cross-country
 Boys' soccer
 Girls' soccer
 Boys' basketball
 Girls' basketball
 Boys' baseball
 Girls' lacrosse
 Co-ed tennis
 Boys' track
 Girls' track

The Latin Lions compete in the D.C. Public Charter School Athletic Association (PCSAA), the creation of which was spearheaded by Latin's former athletic director, Richard Bettencourt.

In 2017, Washington Latin had its first student sign a National Letter of Intent to play a Division I sport in college.

References

Charter schools in the District of Columbia
Educational institutions established in 2006
Public high schools in Washington, D.C.
Public middle schools in Washington, D.C.
2006 establishments in Washington, D.C.